Han Hee-won (Korean 한희원) (born 10 June 1978 in Seoul) is a retired South Korean professional golfer on the LPGA Tour. She was a member of the LPGA Tour from 2001 until her retirement in 2014 and won six LPGA Tour events during her career. She attended Ryukoku University and turned professional in 1998.

In 1998 she competed on the LPGA of Korea Tour and the LPGA of Japan Tour, claiming Rookie of the Year honours in Japan. In 1999 she won twice in Japan. She qualified for the U.S.-based LPGA Tour at the 2000 Qualifying School and has played mainly in the United States since 2001. She was Rookie of the Year in her first season.

Han played in only seven events during 2007 due to the birth of her son, Dae-Il "Dale".

Han retired from the LPGA Tour at the 2014 Portland Classic.

Professional wins (8)

LPGA Tour wins (6)

LPGA Tour playoff record (3–3)

LPGA of Japan wins (2)
1999 (2) NEC Kairuzawa Tournament, Osaka Women's Open

Results in LPGA majors
Results not in chronological order before 2014.

^ The Evian Championship was added as a major in 2013.

CUT = missed the half-way cut
WD = withdrew
"T" = tied for place

Summary

Most consecutive cuts made – 16 (2001 LPGA – 2005 U.S. Open)
Longest streak of top-10s – 1 (five times)

Team appearances
Amateur
Espirito Santo Trophy (representing South Korea): 1996 (winners)

Professional
Lexus Cup (representing Asia team): 2005, 2006 (winners)

References

External links

South Korean female golfers
LPGA Tour golfers
LPGA of Japan Tour golfers
Asian Games medalists in golf
Asian Games silver medalists for South Korea
Golfers at the 1994 Asian Games
Medalists at the 1994 Asian Games
Golfers from Seoul
1978 births
Living people